Oppomorus purpureocinctus is a species of sea snail, a marine gastropod mollusk, in the family Muricidae, the murex snails or rock snails.

Distribution
This marine species occurs off Sri Lanka.

References

External links
 Preston, H. B. (1909). Description of new land and marine shells from Ceylon and S. India. Records of the Indian Museum. 3 (2): 133-140; 3 (3): pl. 22. Calcutta.
  Claremont, M.; Houart, R.; Williams, S. T. & Reid, D. G. (2013). A molecular phylogenetic framework for the Ergalataxinae (Neogastropoda: Muricidae). Journal of Molluscan Studies. 79 (1): 19-29

purpureocinctus
Gastropods described in 1909